Stemonosudis elegans, the tailspot barracudina, is a species of fish found in the Indo-Pacific.

Size

See also 
 List of marine bony fishes of South Africa

References

External links 
 Stemonosudis elegans at FishBase

Paralepididae
Taxa named by Vilhelm Ege
Fish described in 1933